These are the official results of the Men's 800 metres event at the 1987 IAAF World Championships in Rome, Italy. There were a total number of 45 participating athletes, with six qualifying heats, four quarter-finals, two semi-finals and the final held on Tuesday September 1, 1987.

In the final José Luiz Barbosa took the lead from the break, chased primarily by Billy Konchellah and Faouzi Lahbi up to a 50.59 400 metres.  Peter Elliott stayed on the rail slightly off the lead through the first lap joined by Stephen Ole Marai on the outside and  Tom McKean boxed on the inside.  Through the penultimate turn, these three tried to move forward, Elliott moving outside to the shoulders of the lead pack, followed by Mara and McKean, but McKean was held inside.  By the time they reached the backstretch, McKean tried again to run around Marai, this time he tripped over Marai, injuring himself, eventually falling out the back of the field.  Konchellah caught Barbosa at the end of the straightaway and went into the lead.  Elliott tried to follow, but Barbosa held him off through the turn.  By the end of the turn, the three medalists had separated from the rest of the field, Lahbi the last to hold on.  As Konchellah sprinted away to victory, Barbosa and Elliott both started sprinting for home in chase.  Barbosa came off the turn a bit wide, leaving room for Elliott to slowly edge his way along the rail and ahead of Barbosa to take the silver.

Medalists

Final

Semi-finals
Held on Monday 1987-08-31

Quarter-finals
Held on Sunday 1987-08-30

Qualifying heats
Held on Saturday 1987-08-29

See also
 1983 Men's World Championships 800 metres (Helsinki)
 1984 Men's Olympic 800 metres (Los Angeles)
 1986 Men's European Championships 800 metres (Stuttgart)
 1988 Men's Olympic 800 metres (Seoul)
 1990 Men's European Championships 800 metres (Split)
 1991 Men's World Championships 800 metres (Tokyo)

References
 Results

 
800 metres at the World Athletics Championships